Witches' Night (German: Walpurgisnacht) is a 1927 German silent film directed by James Bauer and starring Gerd Briese, Vivian Gibson and Evelyn Holt.

The film's art direction was by Robert A. Dietrich.

Cast
 Gerd Briese 
 Vivian Gibson 
 Evelyn Holt 
 Dietrich Ulpts

References

Bibliography
 Grange, William. Cultural Chronicle of the Weimar Republic. Scarecrow Press, 2008.

External links

1927 films
Films of the Weimar Republic
German silent feature films
Films directed by James Bauer
Bavaria Film films
German black-and-white films
Walpurgis Night fiction